New York Stars could refer to:

New York Stars (WBL), a team that two three seasons in the Women's Professional Basketball League before disbanding in 1980
New York Stars (WFL), a team in the World Football League that relocated in 1974 and became the Charlotte Hornets (WFL)